Adobe Experience Cloud (AEC), formerly Adobe Marketing Cloud (AMC), is a collection of integrated online marketing and web analytics products  by Adobe Inc.

History
Adobe Experience Cloud includes a set of analytics, social, advertising, media optimization, targeting, Web experience management and content management products aimed at the advertising industry and hosted on Microsoft Azure. Like other Adobe Cloud services (e.g., Adobe Creative Cloud), the Adobe Marketing Cloud allows users with valid subscriptions to download the entire collection and use it directly on their computers with open access to online updates.

The Adobe Marketing Cloud collection was introduced to the public in October 2012 as Adobe began retiring the Omniture name it acquired in October 2009. Products of the defunct company were then integrated step-by-step into the new Cloud service which includes the following eight applications: Adobe Analytics, Adobe Target, Adobe Social, Adobe Experience Manager, Adobe Media Optimizer, Adobe Campaign (Classic and Standard), Audience Manager and Primetime. In November 2013, Adobe Systems introduced mobile features to its Marketing Cloud, making smartphones and other mobile devices new targets for analytics.

On September 15, 2009, Omniture, Inc. and Adobe Systems announced that Adobe would be acquiring Omniture, an online marketing and web analytics business unit in Orem, Utah. The deal of $1.8 billion, was completed on October 23, 2009, and is now joined by other Adobe acquisitions such as Day Software and Efficient Frontier, as the main components of Adobe's Digital Marketing Business Unit. Around 2012, Adobe withdrew the Omniture brand while its products were being integrated into the Adobe Marketing Cloud.

In 2013 Adobe acquired Satellite TMS from Search Discovery and renamed Adobe Dynamic Tag Management (Adobe DTM) to replace their Adobe Tag Manager.
Adobe Launch came out in 2018. Launch the next-generation tag management system. The system, designed by Adobe, was released in 2018. It uses the latest technologies and on top of this, is designed for the needs of modern digital marketing. You don’t have the excuse of cost anymore – Launch is free, you should have a valid contract with Adobe only.

On May 21, 2018, Adobe announced the acquisition of Magento for $1.68 billion. The addition of the Magento Commerce will enable commerce features to be integrated into the Adobe Experience Cloud.

In the same year, on September 20, 2018, Adobe acquired the marketing automation company Marketo. The acquisition is expected to close in Q4 2018.

In 2021 Adobe Experience Platform Launch is being integrated into Adobe Experience Platform as a suite of data collection technologies.

Products
 Adobe Experience Manager (AEM) is an enterprise content management system and digital asset management. Before its acquisition, it was formerly known as Day CQ5.
 Adobe Campaign is an enterprise Digital Campaign Marketing System. The software provides cloud-based, web-services service that manages direct marketing campaigns, leads, resources, customer data and analytics. The software also allows companies to design and orchestrate targeted and personalized campaigns from direct mail, e-mail, SMS, MMS and more. This software is based on Algorithmic Marketing to provide personalization. Before its acquisition, the software was formerly known as Neolane. Currently, Adobe has two separate versions of the product in the name of Adobe Campaign Classic (Acquired Neolane Version) and Adobe Campaign Standard, the complete cloud-based version built and developed by Adobe.*
 Adobe Audience Manager (AAM) is a data management platform. This software is based on algorithmic modeling that allows the use of data science to either expand existing audiences or classify them into personas using lookalike modeling and predictive analytics.
 Adobe Analytics (was Omniture), is one of industrial leading tool for Web Analytics. Besides default metrics and dimensions, the tool allows user to define tags implemented in webpage for web tracking, so that to create customized dimensions, metrics, segmentations, as well as to create user own's report, dashboards to make various digital marketing, user behavior analysis. Within Adobe Analytics, a tool called Data Warehouse is also provided for scheduling and delivering raw data by email or to FTP server for further data analysis. Different from Google Analytics (Free Version), Adobe Analytics has no free version.

References

Marketing Cloud
As a service
Business intelligence software
Cloud applications
Cloud computing providers
Content management systems
Marketing software
Mobile web
Software distribution
Web analytics
2012 software

fr:Adobe Experience Manager